Vulture Culture is the eighth studio album by The Alan Parsons Project, released in 1985 via the Arista label.

Overview
The first side of the LP (CD tracks 1–4) consists entirely of four-minute pop songs, and the second side varies widely, from the subdued funk of the title track to the bouncing instrumental "Hawkeye".

At the beginning of 1985, the lead single "Let's Talk About Me" reached the Top 40 in Germany (where the album was No. 1), in Switzerland (where Vulture Culture was No. 2) and in the Netherlands. The song features voice-over commentary from Lee Abrams, credited on the album as "Mr. Laser Beam" (an anagram of his name).

In the charts, Vulture Culture was a success in continental Europe, often reaching the Top 10, and in Oceania; whereas it was less successful in North America. It was the last album by the band to be certified Gold.

The song "Hawkeye" is an instrumental but does contain a line from Monica, a woman working at the canteen in Abbey Road Studios. The line she says is: "Only what's on the menu".

This is the only Project album that does not feature the orchestration of Andrew Powell.

Vulture Culture was the last Project album recorded on analogue equipment, and as with the previous two, mixed directly to the digital master tape.

Track listing
All songs written and composed by Alan Parsons and Eric Woolfson.

Vulture Culture was remastered and reissued in 2007 with the following bonus tracks:

<LI>"No Answers Only Questions (final version)" (Woolfson) – 2:12
<LI>"Separate Lives (alternative mix)" – 4:18
<LI>"Hawkeye (demo)" – 3:18
<LI>"The Naked Vulture" – 10:43
<LI>"No Answers Only Questions (the first attempt)" (Woolfson) – 2:56

Personnel
Ian Bairnson – guitar
Colin Blunstone – vocals
Richard Cottle – synthesizer, keyboards, saxophone
Stuart Elliott – percussion, drums
Mr. Laser Beam – vocals, speech/speaker/speaking part
Alan Parsons – keyboards, programming, vocals
David Paton – bass, guitar, vocals
Chris Rainbow – vocals
Eric Woolfson – piano, keyboards, vocals
Lenny Zakatek – vocals

Charts

Year-end charts

Certifications

References

The Alan Parsons Project albums
Concept albums
1985 albums
Albums produced by Alan Parsons
Arista Records albums